The 20th Annual Gotham Independent Film Awards, presented by the Independent Filmmaker Project, were held on November 29, 2010 and were hosted by Patricia Clarkson and Stanley Tucci. The nominees were announced on October 18, 2010.

Winners and nominees

Gotham Tributes
 Darren Aronofsky
 Robert Duvall
 James Schamus
 Hilary Swank

References

External links
 

2010 film awards
2010